Outhine Bounyavong (Lao: ອຸທິນ ບຸນຍາວົງ ʻUthin Bunyāvong, 1942–2000) was a Laotian writer, known especially for works of contemporary fiction.

Born in 1942 in Xaignabouli Province, he grew up in the capital, Vientiane, where one of his early teachers was Somchine Nginn, author of the first novel in Lao.

Outhine held a variety of jobs during the 1960s, and began to publish short fictional works in newspapers and magazines.  He came to be associated with the group of writers who were the children of Maha Sila Viravong, an important Laotian scholar.  Eventually he married one of this group, Duangdeuane Viravong, a prominent author in her own right.

Outhine worked during the Laotian Civil War and, after the Communist victory in 1975, continued to write for the State Publishing House.  Many of his stories celebrate traditional aspects of Laotian rural life, and at least one collection has been translated into English as Mother's Beloved.

In the 1990s, Outhine worked for the Ministry of Information and Culture, where he created children's fiction.

In 1992 along with his wife, Outhine traveled from Lao to the University of Washington to instructing the Lao language to students. After which Outhine returned to Laos and with his wife they created a printing shop named Phai Nam after the magazine founded by Maha Sila Viravong.

1942 births
2000 deaths
Laotian novelists
People from Vientiane
Date of birth missing
Date of death missing
Place of death missing
People from Sainyabuli province
Laotian short story writers
Male novelists
Male short story writers
20th-century novelists
20th-century short story writers
20th-century male writers